Magnar Fosseide (August 19, 1913 – October 1983) was a Norwegian nordic combined skier who competed in the 1930s. He won a bronze medal in the individual event at the 1939 FIS Nordic World Ski Championships in Zakopane.

External links

Norwegian male Nordic combined skiers
1913 births
1983 deaths
FIS Nordic World Ski Championships medalists in Nordic combined
20th-century Norwegian people